Egidio Turchi (born October 4, 1913 in Pistoia) was an Italian professional football player and later in his career became a coach.

Career
Turchi's debut as a professional was for Pistoiese. He played as a midfielder, and remained in Italy for his entire career, representing famous clubs such as Lazio and Napoli.

He coached Pistoiese and Bondenese from 1948 until 1951, managing Colleferro, Bondeno, and ending his career in his hometown and original club, Pistoiese.

External links
 (In Italian) Dario Marchetti (edited by), Egidio Turchi , on Enciclopediadelcalcio.it , 2011.

1913 births
Year of death missing
Italian footballers
Serie A players
U.S. Pistoiese 1921 players
Inter Milan players
U.S. Livorno 1915 players
S.S. Lazio players
S.S.D. Lucchese 1905 players
S.S.C. Napoli players
A.C. Prato players
Palermo F.C. players
Association football midfielders